Altenkirchen may refer to:

Altenkirchen, capital of the district of Altenkirchen, Rhineland-Palatinate, Germany
Administrative divisions centered on this town:
Altenkirchen (district), Rhineland-Palatinate, Germany
Altenkirchen (Verbandsgemeinde), Rhineland-Palatinate, Germany
Altenkirchen, Kusel, a municipality in the district of Kusel, Rhineland-Palatinate, Germany
Altenkirchen, Mecklenburg-Vorpommern, a municipality in the district of Rügen, Mecklenburg-Vorpommern, Germany